"Rather Be Alone" is a song by German DJ Robin Schulz, Greek DJ Nick Martin and American singer Sam Martin. It was released on 13 September 2019 through Warner Germany. The production assistants consist of German band Junkx and American band the Monsters and the Strangerz.

Background 
Robin Schulz and Nick Martin already worked together for several projects. First, it was in 2017, when Nick Martin remixed Robin Schulz song "I Believe I'm Fine". The Greek DJ and producer has too performed on Robin & Friends' Tomorrowland stage in 2019. A few days before the release, Robin Schulz used social networks to make hints about this song. On 11 September, he posted the following message : "coming soon... #chapter2", in reference to this track and to the first chapter which designs his previous single, "All This Love" which was released in May 2019. One day before, he indicated that this second chapter will come on 13 September.

Critical reception 
The song evokes, through Sam Martin’s vocals, a non-reciprocal love that a man has for the woman of his dreams. According to Philipp Kressmann from Westdeutscher Rundfunk, "Rather Be Alone" is heading for the disco and has some brass vibes. He added that the combo "sounds much poppier than [Robin Schulz's] last tracks and reminds of cheerful tunes of Alle Farben or Felix Jaehn". German magazine Klatsch Tratsch noted that it has disco influences, with a new side, by the presence of "a whipping groove with funky brass, housy piano vibes and a vocal voice of Sam Martin". His vocals were also compared to the British-Australian pop-rock group The Bee Gees in their heyday. Similarly, Przemysław Kokot of Polish music portal Wyspa made this comparison. He noted the presence of disco sounds in the number, with "a pulsating groove with funky trumpets, heavy piano sound and Sam Martin's vocal". Hungarian website Zene called the song dizzying and also remarked a fusion between dance-pop elements and disco sensation of the 70s-80s.

Music video 
At the same day of the release, Robin Schulz posted an official lyric video of the single. Then, the official music video of the song was released on 7 October through his YouTube channel, featuring German model Toni Garrn and Scottish band The Electrics. The clip is the continuation of the story which started in "All This Love", the first chapter. It shows the DJ becoming an avatar in a computer simulation and meeting the avatar of the German model. Together they compete against computer opponents in a dance competition. In order to promote Toni Garrn's presence, Robin Schulz said via Instagram, "Proud to announce that @tonigarrn wants to be starring in my new music video !" She commented his post, by leading the following message: "Can not wait to see." The collaboration between the two people was explained by the DJ. He has been looking for a suitable casting for a long time with his producer who asked the model to appear for another project. Schulz thought it might be a good idea, and that’s how their collaboration came about. They met at the shoot and Robin Schulz, according to him, immediately understood with her.

Schulz confessed to German newspaper Hamburger Morgenpost that he wanted to create something original, at least in Germany. During the shooting of the video, his body was photographed by hundred cameras, scanned 360 degrees, in order to shoot every corner. He had orders not to move, and as a result, he considered that it was quite long but rather funny. The DJ described Toni Garrn as "highly professional", with "a very pleasant personality" and noted that she "fits in the story perfectly."

The video also marks the world's first music video that was entirely produced by the games engine Unreal. It was produced in cooperation by A Current State, a company of star photographer and director Robert Wunsch, with Mimic Productions whose founder once developed the Face Motion Capturing for the movie hit "Avatar".

Track listing

Credits and personnel 
Credits adapted from Tidal.

 Robin Schulz – production, composition, lyrics, keyboards, programming
 Nick Martin – production, composition, lyrics, keyboards
 Sam Martin – composition, lyrics, vocals
 Daniel Deimann – composition, lyrics, keyboards, programming
 Dennis Bierbrodt – production, composition, lyrics, keyboards, programming, engineering, mixing
 Guido Kramer – production, composition, lyrics, keyboards, programming, engineering, mixing
 Isidoros Kiloudis – composition, lyrics, keyboards, programming
 Jason Evigan – composition, lyrics
 Jordan Johnson – composition, lyrics, production
 Jürgen Dohr – production, composition, lyrics, programming, engineering, mixing
 Marcus Lomax – composition, lyrics, production
 Sean Douglas – composition, lyrics
 Stefan Dabruck – composition, lyrics
 Stefan Johnson – composition, lyrics, production
 Shane Kairu – composition, lyrics
 Lennie King'ori – composition, lyrics
 Jhawgez Von Rubixx – composition, lyrics
 Spax Di Genius – composition, lyrics
 Alexander Izquierdo – production
 Clarence Coffee Jr – production

Charts

References

External links 
 

2019 singles
Robin Schulz songs
2019 songs
Song recordings produced by the Monsters & Strangerz
Songs written by Sam Martin (singer)
Songs written by Marcus Lomax
Songs written by Stefan Johnson
Warner Music Group singles
Songs written by Robin Schulz
Songs written by Jason Evigan
Songs written by Sean Douglas (songwriter)
Songs written by Jürgen Dohr